Ivesia is also a synonym for the Nesticus spider genus.

Ivesia is a genus of flowering plants in the rose family known generally as mousetails. They are perennial herbs native to western North America, especially the western United States. Plants of this genus are sometimes treated as members of genus Potentilla.

Species include:
Ivesia aperta — Sierra Valley mousetail
Ivesia argyrocoma — silverhair mousetail
Ivesia arizonica — rock whitefeather
Ivesia baileyi — Bailey's ivesia
Ivesia callida — Tahquitz mousetail
Ivesia campestris — field mousetail
Ivesia cryptocaulis — Charleston Peak mousetail
Ivesia gordonii — Gordon's ivesia
Ivesia jaegeri — Jaeger's mousetail
Ivesia kingii — King's mousetail
Ivesia longibracteata — longbract mousetail
Ivesia lycopodioides — clubmoss mousetail
Ivesia muirii — granite mousetail
Ivesia multifoliolata — manyleaf mousetail
Ivesia paniculata — Ash Creek mousetail
Ivesia patellifera — Kingston Mountain mousetail
Ivesia pickeringii — silky mousetail
Ivesia pityocharis — Pine Nut Mountain mousetail
Ivesia pygmaea — dwarf mousetail
Ivesia rhypara — grimy mousetail
Ivesia sabulosa — intermountain mousetail
Ivesia santolinoides — Sierra mousetail
Ivesia saxosa — rock mousetail
Ivesia sericoleuca — Plumas mousetail
Ivesia shockleyi — sky mousetail
Ivesia tweedyi — Tweedy's mousetail
Ivesia unguiculata — Yosemite mousetail
Ivesia utahensis — Utah mousetail
Ivesia webberi — wire mousetail

External links
Jepson Manual Treatment

 
Rosaceae genera